Frustration Dome is a large crevassed ice dome about  southeast of Mount Henderson in Mac. Robertson Land, Antarctica. The dome was the site of a tellurometer station established during an Australian National Antarctic Research Expeditions (ANARE) traverse from Mawson Station to Mount Kjerka in 1967, and was so named by ANARE because the traverse party was delayed here by vehicle breakdown, delaying completion of the survey until the next spring.

References

Ice caps of Antarctica
Bodies of ice of Mac. Robertson Land